Vlaka may refer to:

 Vlaka, Ravno, a village in Bosnia and Herzegovina in Ravno municipality. Formerly it was in Trebinje municipality
 , a village in the municipality Vrgorac, Split-Dalmatia County, Croatia
 , a village in municipality  Slivno, Dubrovnik-Neretva County, Croatia
 , an island in the Adriatic Sea, one of the Paklinski Islands

Other 
 Vlaka, a Greek word for stupid/idiot male. Often used by Greeks when speaking English. Female version is vlammeni